Progressive Youth Organization (Sazman-e Javanan-e Mutarraqi) was an anti-revisionist Marxist–Leninist organization in Afghanistan. The organization emerged from the New Democratic Current (Jerian-e Demokratik-e Navin), a leftist movement that had been established by Abdulrahim Mahmudi, Abdulhadi Mahmudi, Akram Yari and Seddiq Yari. The New Democratic Current founded the PYO in October 1965. PYO never made its existence or name known to the public. The group brought out the publication Shalleh-ye Javid ('Eternal Flame'), and its followers were generally known as sholayes. PYO was dissolved in 1972.

References

External links 

Youth organizations established in 1965
Organizations disestablished in 1972
1965 establishments in Afghanistan
1972 disestablishments in Afghanistan
Anti-revisionist organizations
Maoist organisations in Afghanistan
Youth organisations based in Afghanistan
Youth wings of communist parties